Armando Rivero Luzardo (born February 1, 1988) is a Cuban professional baseball pitcher who plays for Criollos de Caguas.

Career

Rivero previously played for the Industriales in the Cuban National Series. After 2011 he defected from Cuba to pursue a Major League Baseball career. In March 2013, he signed a minor league contract with the Chicago Cubs worth $3.1 million. He made his debut in June of that year with the Kane County Cougars. He was later promoted to the Daytona Cubs and the Double-A Tennessee Smokies. He finished the season 0–1 with a 4.15 earned run average (ERA) and 45 strikeouts in  innings. After the season, he played in the Arizona Fall League. Rivero started the 2014 season back with Tennessee. He was promoted to the Triple-A Iowa Cubs in June. Rivero ended 2014 with a 5-1 record along with a 2.22 ERA. Rivero has been with Iowa since his 2014 promotion, posting a 3.16 ERA in 2015 and a 2.13 ERA in 2016.

On December 8, 2016, Rivero was selected by the Atlanta Braves in the 2016 Rule 5 draft. He was released on October 31, 2017.

On July 19, 2018, Rivero signed with the Piratas de Campeche of the Mexican Baseball League. He became a free agent after the season.

See also
Rule 5 draft results

References

External links

1988 births
Living people
Kane County Cougars players
Daytona Cubs players
Tennessee Smokies players
Iowa Cubs players
Defecting Cuban baseball players
Vaqueros de la Habana players
Industriales de La Habana players
Criollos de Caguas players
Cuban expatriate baseball players in Puerto Rico
Liga de Béisbol Profesional Roberto Clemente pitchers
Mesa Solar Sox players
Minor league baseball players
Baseball players from Havana